Mount Ningadhun, also known as Castle Rock, Ningadoon (Hunt), and Ningadhun, is a mountain on the Nandewar Range, a spur off the Great Dividing Range, is located in the North West Slopes region of New South Wales, Australia. Mount Ningadhun is situated east of Narrabri, within the Mount Kaputar National Park

See also 

 List of mountains in New South Wales

References

Volcanic plugs of New South Wales
Mountains of New South Wales
Miocene volcanoes
North West Slopes
Narrabri Shire